The 2022–23 Ukrainian football championship among amateur teams was the 27th season since it replaced the football championship of physical culture teams. The league competition is organized by the Association of Amateur Football of Ukraine (AAFU).

On 5 September 2022, the AAFU published information about the upcoming season with a tentative composition. The championship started on 10 September 2022. Since the Russo-Ukrainian War grew in its intensity in 2022, many clubs were not able to field their teams for the competition.

Teams

Returning/reformed clubs 
 LSTM 536 Lutsk – (last played during 2019–20 season)
 Varatyk Kolomyia – (last played during 2020–21 season)
 Fakel Lypovets – (last played during 2018–19 season)

Debut  
List of teams that are debuting this season in the league:

 Kulykiv
 Shturm Ivankiv

 Kolos Polonne
 Skala 1911 Stryi (late start)

 Druzhba Myrivka

Withdrawn teams
List of clubs that took part in last year competition, but chose not to participate in 2022–23 season:

 Yunist Verkhnia Bilka
 Feniks Pidmonastyr
 Dovbush Chernivtsi
 OFKIP Kyiv
 Yednist Kyiv
 OSDYuShOR-FC Zaporizhia

 Olimp Kamianske
 Prykarpattia-Teplovyk Ivano-Frankivsk
 Urahan Cherniiv
 Nyva Terebovlia
 UCSA Kyiv
 Khliborob Nyzhni Torhayi

 ODEK Orzhiv
 Mayak Sarny
 Kudrivka
 Bila Tserkva
 Kakhovka
 Lehioner Dnipro

Location map 
The following displays the location of teams.

Stadiums
Group A
Group B

Notes:
 Reg — regional championship (Regions of Ukraine)
 Am[#] — AAFU championship where sign (#) indicates Group number

Group stage

Group 1

Notes

Group 2

Notes

Final stage
To the stage qualify eight teams, selection of which is determined exclusively by the AAFU Commission in conducting competitions.

Promotions to the Second League
The amateur teams are allowed to participate in the Ukrainian championship among teams of the 2023–24 Ukrainian Second League under such conditions:
 Team participated in the Ukrainian championship among amateur teams throughout the 2022–23 season and was a participant of the championship play-off stage.
 The club received a license in accordance to the Regulation on licensing of football clubs of the Ukrainian Second League.
 The club and its results of participation in the AAFU competitions meet the requirements that are defined in regulations of the All-Ukrainian competitions in football among clubs' teams of the 2022–23 Professional Football League of Ukraine.

See also
 2022–23 Ukrainian Second League
 2022–23 Ukrainian First League
 2022–23 Ukrainian Premier League
 2022–23 Ukrainian Amateur Cup

Notes

References

External links
AAFU
ААФУ: 14 голів у 5 матчах на старті, затінені імена зі школою Динамо та Шахтаря. Sport Arena. 12 September 2022
ААФУ: гол воротаря, центральний матч у Миргороді, лідерство Агрона та Колоса. Sport Arena. 19 September 2022
ААФУ: перша втрата Дружби, яскрава нічия Колоса та Агрона, Мотор виграв ключовий матч. Sport Arena. 26 September 2022
ААФУ: Кавун приніс Атлету найбільш сенсаційну перемогу в турі. Sport Arena. 4 October 2022

Ukrainian Football Amateur League seasons
Amateur
Ukraine
Sports events affected by the 2022 Russian invasion of Ukraine